Castelao may refer to:

People
Alfonso Daniel Rodríguez Castelao, Galician politician, writer, painter and doctor
Ofelia Rey Castelao (b. 1956), Galician historian, writer, and university professor

Association football stadiums nicknamed Castelão
Castelão (Maranhão) (Estádio Governador João Castelo), located in São Luís, Maranhão, Brazil
Castelão (Ceará) (Estádio Plácido Aderaldo Castelo), located in Fortaleza, Ceará, Brazil

Other
Castelão (grape), a Portuguese wine grape grown in the Bairrada DOC and other regions.